Bolinsky is a surname. It is the German spelling of the Polish surname Polinski.

People with the surname include

 David Bolinsky (born 1952), American artist
 Mitch Bolinsky (born 1958), American politician

References 

Surnames
German-language surnames